The relationship between mathematics and physics has been a subject of study of philosophers, mathematicians and physicists since Antiquity, and more recently also by historians and educators. Generally considered a relationship of great intimacy, mathematics has been described as "an essential tool for physics" and physics has been described as "a rich source of inspiration and insight in mathematics".

In his work Physics, one of the topics treated by Aristotle is about how the study carried out by mathematicians differs from that carried out by physicists. Considerations about mathematics being the language of nature can be found in the ideas of the Pythagoreans: the convictions that "Numbers rule the world" and "All is number", and two millennia later were also expressed by Galileo Galilei: "The book of nature is written in the language of mathematics".

Before giving a mathematical proof for the formula for the volume of a sphere, Archimedes used physical reasoning to discover the solution (imagining the balancing of bodies on a scale). From the seventeenth century, many of the most important advances in mathematics appeared motivated by the study of physics, and this continued in the following centuries (although in the nineteenth century mathematics started to become increasingly independent from physics). The creation and development of calculus were strongly linked to the needs of physics: There was a need for a new mathematical language to deal with the new dynamics that had arisen from the work of scholars such as Galileo Galilei and Isaac Newton. During this period there was little distinction between physics and mathematics; as an example, Newton regarded geometry as a branch of mechanics. As time progressed, the mathematics used in physics has become increasingly sophisticated, as in the case of superstring theory.

Philosophical problems 
Some of the problems considered in the philosophy of mathematics are the following:

Explain the effectiveness of mathematics in the study of the physical world: "At this point an enigma presents itself which in all ages has agitated inquiring minds. How can it be that mathematics, being after all a product of human thought which is independent of experience, is so admirably appropriate to the objects of reality?" —Albert Einstein, in Geometry and Experience (1921).
Clearly delineate mathematics and physics: For some results or discoveries, it is difficult to say to which area they belong: to the mathematics or to physics.
What is the geometry of physical space?
What is the origin of the axioms of mathematics?
How does the already existing mathematics influence in the creation and development of physical theories?
Is arithmetic analytic or synthetic? (from Kant, see Analytic–synthetic distinction)
What is essentially different between doing a physical experiment to see the result and making a mathematical calculation to see the result? (from the Turing–Wittgenstein debate)
Do Gödel's incompleteness theorems imply that physical theories will always be incomplete? (from Stephen Hawking)
Is mathematics invented or discovered? (millennia-old question, raised among others by Mario Livio)

Education 
In recent times the two disciplines have most often been taught separately, despite all the interrelations between physics and mathematics. This led some professional mathematicians who were also interested in mathematics education, such as Felix Klein, Richard Courant, Vladimir Arnold and Morris Kline, to strongly advocate teaching mathematics in a way more closely related to the physical sciences.

See also 

Pure mathematics
Applied mathematics
Theoretical physics
Mathematical physics
Non-Euclidean geometry
Fourier series
Conic section
Kepler's laws of planetary motion
Saving the phenomena
Positron#History
The Unreasonable Effectiveness of Mathematics in the Natural Sciences
Mathematical universe hypothesis
Zeno's paradoxes
Axiomatic system
Mathematical model
Hilbert's sixth problem
Empiricism
Logicism
Formalism
Mathematics of general relativity
Bourbaki
Experimental mathematics
History of Maxwell's equations
Philosophy of mathematics#Platonism
History of astronomy
Why Johnny Can't Add

References

Further reading 

 (part 1) (part 2).

External links 
 Gregory W. Moore – Physical Mathematics and the Future (July 4, 2014)
 IOP Institute of Physics – Mathematical Physics: What is it and why do we need it? (September 2014)

Philosophy of physics
Philosophy of mathematics
History of science
Mathematics education
Physics education
Foundations of mathematics
History of mathematics
History of physics